Fantastic Fest is an annual film festival in Austin, Texas. It was founded in 2005 by Tim League of Alamo Drafthouse, Harry Knowles of Ain't It Cool News, Paul Alvarado-Dykstra, and Tim McCanlies, writer of The Iron Giant and Secondhand Lions.

Lisa Dreyer is festival director. Annick Mahnert is head of programming.

History

The festival focuses on genre films such as horror, science fiction, fantasy, action, Asian, and cult. The festival takes place in September at the Alamo Drafthouse South Lamar, filling eight screens for eight days and hosting many writers, directors, and actors, either well-established or unknown. The festival has become known as a launch-pad for genre films, where critical acclaim at the fest can lead to big box office returns. A notable feature of this festival is the inclusion of "secret screenings". For these screenings, the audience often does not know what the film will be until seated, moments before it begins. It also features many themed parties, outings, film-themed "feasts", and other events that are hallmarks of the original Alamo Drafthouse Cinema. In 2007, Variety publisher Charles Koones included Fantastic Fest as one of "ten festivals we love". In 2008, Moviemaker named Fantastic Fest "one of the 25 film festivals worth the entry fee". In 2017, Moviemaker listed Fantastic Fest in "The 25 Coolest Film Festivals in the World."

In 2022, an online-exclusive section of programming was created: "Burnt Ends." In this new segment, Fantastic Fest wants to showcase "the weirdest, wildest, most fringe films out there."

Festivals by year (2005 — 2009)

2005
The 2005 festival was only three days long, October 6–9. Screened films included Feast, Wolf Creek, and Zathura. The official sponsors of the 2005 festival were Milkshake Media, KOOP Radio, The Austin Chronicle, Jackson Walker LLP, and Independence Brewery.

U.S. premieres
 Hakugei: Legend of the Moby Dick

Texas premieres
 The Big White
 The Birthday
 Creep
 The Dark Hours
 G.O.R.A.
 Malefique
 Marebito
 Night of the Living Dorks
 P
 Pulse
 Strings
 The Wild Blue Yonder
 Wolf Creek

Special screenings
 Sneak preview of Feast
 Work-in-progress sneak preview of Hostel
 Sneak preview of the recut and extended version of Sin City
 Sneak preview of Zathura
 A Scanner Darkly

Retrospective screenings
The theme of the 2005 retrospective series was "Post Apocalyptic Cinema".
 The Last Wave
 Miracle Mile
 No Blade of Grass
 1990: The Bronx Warriors

Special events
The special effects team from The Lion, the Witch and the Wardrobe installed a display of costumes, creatures and props from the Narnia film. Legendary makeup and effects supervisor Howard Berger presided over a special effects Q&A.

2006
The 2006 festival was expanded to 8 days and held September 21–28.

World premiere
 Roman with Q&A by director Angela Bettis and star Lucky McKee

U.S. premieres
 Gamerz
 Isolation
 Lie Still with Q&A by director Sean Hogan
 The Living and the Dead with Q&A by director Simon Rumley
 The Woods
 Blood Trails
 Broken
 The Host
 Blood Tea and Red String
 Frank and Wendy
 Bug with Q&A by star Michael Shannon
 The Hamster Cage with Q&A by director Larry Kent
 Venus Drowning

Texas premieres
 Abominable
 The Beach Party at the Threshold of Hell
 The District!
 Firefly
 Frostbite
 The Glamorous Life of Sachiko Hanai
 Hatchet with Q&A by director Adam Green
 Inside with Q&A by director Jeff Mahler
 The Last Supper
 Funky Forest (aka Naisu No Mori)
 Nightmare
 Origin: Spirits of the Past
 The Piano Tuner of Earthquakes
 Puzzlehead
 A Quiet Love
 Renaissance
 Severance
 Shinobi: Heart Under Blade
 Shiva
 Simon Says with Q&A with star Crispin Glover
 Starfish Hotel
 Unrest
 Wilderness
 Zhest

Special screenings
 An unfinished version of Apocalypto, followed by a Q&A with Mel Gibson and star Rudy Youngblood
 Pan's Labyrinth; director Guillermo del Toro was unable to attend but sent along a written introduction for the audience
 Advance screening of Beowulf & Grendel
 Advance screening of Terry Gilliam's Tideland
 Advance screening of The Fountain with Q&A by director Darren Aronofsky
 Advance screening of Edmond
 Advance screening of The Texas Chainsaw Massacre: The Beginning

Retrospective screenings
There were three retrospective series. The first paid homage to cult midnight films and included:

 Parasite 3-D
 Northville Cemetery Massacre
 The Texas Chain Saw Massacre with Q&A by star Edwin Neal ("The Hitchhiker")
 A Nightmare on Elm Street
 Fantastic Planet presented by Darren Aronofsky
The second was presented by cult author Jack Stevenson and included:
 A compilation of films depicting drugs in American film
 Scandinavian Sinema, a presentation of postwar Scandinavian erotic cinema
 Haxan: Witchcraft Through the Ages
And the third was a retrospective of the action/crime films of director Ram Gopal Varma, featuring:
 Ab Tak Chhappan
 Company
 Ek Hasina Thi

There was also Meltdown Memoirs, a documentary about the making of Street Trash, which also played.

Award winners

Horror Jury Awards, for excellence in the horror genre
 Best Picture – Isolation
 Best Director – Billy O'Brien, for Isolation
 Best Script – Dylan Bank and Morgan Pehme for Nightmare
 Best Actor – Kane Hodder for Hatchet
 Best Actress – Nicole Roderick for Nightmare
 Best Supporting Actor – Lance Henriksen for Abominable
 Best Supporting Actress – Kristen Bell for Roman
 Best Art Direction – Alex Boynton for Unrest
 Best Cinematography – Robby Ryan for Isolation
 Best Special Effects – Hatchet
 Best Make-up – Broken

Serving on the horror jury were Jay Slater of FilmThreat.com, Edwin Neal of The Texas Chain Saw Massacre, Peter Martin of Twitch.com, and Chris Cargill of AintItCoolNews.com.

Short Film Jury Awards
 Best of Show – The Listening Dead
 Best Short-Form – Cost of Living
 Best Long-Form – Rogairi (Villains)
 Best Animated – If I Had a Hammer
 Best Comedy – They're Made Out of Meat

Serving on the Short Film Jury were Brian Satterwhite, Jay Knowles and Chris Cargill, all of AintItcoolNews.com.

Fantastic Fest Jury Awards, for excellence in films outside the horror genre
 Best Film — The Living and the Dead
 Best Director — Simon Rumley for The Living and the Dead
 Best Script — Larry Kent and Daniel Williams for The Hamster Cage
 Best Actor — Leo Bill from The Living and the Dead
 Best Actress — Jodie Jameson from Venus Drowning
 Best Supporting Actor — Alan Scarfe from The Hamster Cage
 Best Supporting Actress — Kate Fahy from The Living and the Dead
 Best Art Direction — Starfish Hotel
 Best Cinematography — A Quiet Love
 Best Special Effects — Puzzlehead
 Best Makeup — The Living and the Dead
 Special Jury Mention — Blood Tea and Red String

Serving on the Fantastic Fest Jury Awards were Christian Hallman of the Lund International Fantastic Film Festival, Wiley Wiggins of Dazed and Confused and Waking Life, and Scott Weinberg of Fearnet and Cinematical.com.

Audience Awards
 1st Place – Hatchet
 2nd Place – Isolation
 3rd Place – Firefly

Highlights
 A notable highlight for the audience occurred when Mel Gibson walked into the theater.
 Closing night party was Undead Till Dawn, a vampire-themed dance party
 There was a special screening timed with the release of 42nd STREET FOREVER VOLUME 5: ALAMO DRAFTHOUSE EDITION where every trailer was shown in 35mm

2007
The 2007 festival was held September 20–27. In 2007, Fantastic Fest became a supporting member of the Melies European Federation of Fantastic Film Festivals and helped to found the North American Fantastic Festival Alliance, along with Fantasia International Film Festival in Montreal and Dead Channels in San Francisco. The official sponsors of the 2007 Fantastic Fest were AMD, Stella Artois, AT&T, Twitch.com, B-Side, Rue Morgue, Fangoria, and Mondo Macabro.

World premieres
 There Will Be Blood, with a Q&A by director Paul Thomas Anderson
 Los Cronocrímenes (Timecrimes), with director Nacho Vigalondo in attendance (Timecrimes was purchased out of the festival by Magnolia Films for theatrical distribution, and remake rights were purchased by United Artists.)

U.S. premieres
 Alone
 The Backwoods
 The Devil's Chair
 Diary of the Dead with Q&A by director George A. Romero
 Flash Point
 Hell's Fever
 La Hora Fria (The Cold Hour)
 Inside
 Invisible Target
 Maiko Haaaan!!!
 Mirageman with Q&A by director Ernesto Diaz Espinoza and action star Marko Zaror
 Rug Cop
 Summer Scars
 Wolfhound
 Wrong Turn 2: Dead End with Q&A by director Joe Lynch

Texas premieres
 Aachi & Ssipak
 The Beautiful Beast
 Blood, Boobs, and Beast
 Death Note
 Death Note 2: The Last Name
 Devil's Helper: The Folk Art Films of Phil Chambliss
 A Dirty Carnival
 Dog Bite Dog
 End of The Line
 The Entrance
 Exte: Hair Extensions
 The Ferryman
 Finishing the Game
 Five Across The Eyes
 Flight of the Living Dead
 The Girl Next Door
 The Girl Who Leapt Through Time
 Hell's Ground
 Kiltro with Q&A by director Ernesto Díaz Espinoza and star Marco Zaror
 The Last Winter
 Moebius Redux: A Life In Pictures with Q&A by director Hasko Baumann
 Never Belongs To Me
 Offscreen
 Postal with Q&A by director Uwe Boll and actor Zack Ward
 Princess
 Retribution
 Sex and Death 101
 Son of Rambow
 Spiral
 The Sword Bearer
 Taxidermia
 Uncle's Paradise (the food/film feature of the year)
 Weirdsville
 Wicked Flowers

Special screenings
 Southland Tales, the world premiere of the final version after heavy edits, with Q&A by director Richard Kelly
 Persepolis
 Dai Nipponjin (Big Man Japan)
 El Orfanto (The Orphanage), with Q&A by director Juan Antonio Bayona

Retrospective screenings
The Nikkatsu action series featured films mainly never before shown theatrically in the U.S.:
 Velvet Hustler
 The Warped Ones
 A Colt Is My Passport
 Crazy Thunder Road

Award winners

AMD Next Wave Award, for excellence by an up-and-coming filmmaker
 Gold Medal – Los Cronocrímenes (TimeCrimes)
 Silver Medal – Spiral
 Bronze Medal – Mirageman
 Special Jury Prize for Innovative Vision – End of the Line

Horror Jury Award, for excellence in the horror genre
 Gold Medal – Exte (Hair Extensions)
 Silver Medal – Alone
 Bronze Medal – The Devil's Chair

Fantastic Fest Jury Award, for excellence outside of the horror genre
 Gold Medal – Offscreen
 Silver Medal – Never Belongs to Me
 Bronze Medal – Aachi and Ssipak
 Special Jury Prize for Most Original Scenario – Never Belongs to Me

Horror Shorts Award
 Gold Medal – "In the Wall"
 Silver Medal – "The Fifth"
 Bronze Medal – "Far Out"

Animated Shorts Award
 Gold Medal – "Everything Will Be OK"
 Silver Medal – "Raymond"
 Bronze Medal – "X-Pression"

Fantastic Shorts Award
 Gold Medal – "Waiting For Yesterday"
 Silver Medal – "Sniffer"
 Bronze Medal – "Suityman"

Audience Award
 Gold Medal – Mirageman
 Silver Medal – TimeCrimes
 Bronze Medal – Jack Ketchum's The Girl Next Door

Highlights
 Shooting shotguns with the Next Wave directors
 Impromptu karaoke party and Fantastic Feud game show
 Watching pornography (Japanese pinku Uncle's Paradise) in the front yard of festival director Tim League's house
 Q&A by director Uwe Boll and star Zack Ward after a screening of Postal

2008
Fantastic Fest 2008 was held September 18–25.

World premieres
 Feast 2: Sloppy Seconds, with director John Gulager and most of the cast in attendance
 Santos, with director Nicolás López in attendance
 Seventh Moon, with director Eduardo Sanchez and stars Amy Smart and Tim Chiou in attendance
 Zombie Girl: The Movie

US premieres
 Acolytes with director Jon Hewitt in attendance
 Art of the Devil 3
 Sauna
 Deadgirl with directors Gadi Harel and Marcel Sarmiento in attendance.

Texas premieres
 Alien Raiders
 Astropia
 The Burrowers
 Cargo 200
 The Chaser
 Chocolate
 La Creme
 Dark Floors
 Doctor Infierno
 Donkey Punch
 Estomago: A Gastronomic Story (food/film event)
 Ex Drummer
 Fanboys
 Fear(s) of the Dark
 Fighter
 Gachi Boy: Wrestling With a Memory
 The Good, The Bad, the Weird
 How To Get Rid of Others
 I Think We're Alone Now
 Jack Brooks: Monster Slayer
 JCVD
 Just Another Love Story
 Late Bloomer
 Left Bank
 Let The Right One In
 Martyrs
 Muay Thai Chaiya
 Pulse 2: Afterlife
 Repo! The Genetic Opera
 Rule of Three
 South of Heaven
 Spine Tingler — The William Castle Story
 The Substitute
 Surveillance with Q&A by director Jennifer Lynch
 Terra
 Tokyo!
 Tokyo Gore Police
 Vinyan
 Wicked Lake
 The Wild Man of the Navidad
 The Wreck
 Your Name Here

Special screenings
 Zack and Miri Make a Porno (opening night film) with guest director Kevin Smith in attendance (followed by the Air Sex World Championships)
 The Brothers Bloom, with director Rian Johnson in attendance
 Appaloosa
 Eagle Eye (with road rally scavenger hunt)
 Role Models, with Paul Rudd and David Wain in attendance
 RocknRolla
 City of Ember (closing night film), with Bill Murray and Gil Kenan in attendance

Retrospective screenings
There was an Ozploitation retrospective featuring Australian exploitation films from the '70s and '80s:
 Dark Age
 Mad Max
 The Man from Hong Kong
 Razorback
 Road Warrior, shown on an outdoor screen in the parking lot
 Turkey Shoot

And the documentary Not Quite Hollywood about Ozploitation in the golden age.

There was also a sampling of Japanese "pinku" titles, including
 Blue Film Woman
 Gushing Prayer
 A Lonely Cow Weeps at Dawn
 S&M Hunter

Award winners

AMD Next Wave Award for excellence by an up-and-coming filmmaker
 Gold Medal – Tokyo Gore Police
 Silver Medal – Deadgirl
 Bronze Medal – La Creme

AMD Fantastic Fest Online
 Best Feature Film – South of Heaven
 Best Short Film – Treevenge

Horror Features, for excellence in the horror genre
 Gold Medal – Let the Right One In
 Silver Medal – Acolytes
 Bronze Medal – Donkey Punch
 Special Jury Award for most politically incorrect gore – Feast 2
 Special Jury Award for best use of latex – Jack Brooks: Monster Slayer

Fantastic Features, for excellence outside of the horror genre
 Gold Medal – How to Get Rid of Others
 Silver Medal – Cargo 200
 Bronze Medal – Ex Drummer
 Special Jury Award for originality and vision – Santos

Horror Shorts
 Gold Medal – "Electric Fence"
 Silver Medal – "I Love Sarah Jane"
 Bronze Medal – "El Senor Puppe"
 Special Jury Award – "The Horribly Slow Murderer with the Extremely Inefficient Weapon"

Fantastic Shorts
 Gold Medal – "The Object"
 Silver Medal – "Spandex Man"
 Bronze Medal – "Stagman"
 Special Jury Award for Visual Invention – "Rojo Red"

Animated Shorts
 Gold Medal – "Bernie's Doll"
 Silver Medal – "Muto"
 Bronze Medal – "Violeta"
 Special Jury Award for Technical Merit – "The Facts in the Case of Mr. Hollow"

Highlights
 Director Nacho Vigalondo covering his face with honey and shooting himself with a confetti cannon following the screening of his short films.
 The "shaky-face" badge photos required attendees to submit a picture of themselves taken while violently shaking their heads back and forth. This resulted in some very unusual portraits.
 The Fantastic Debates pitted film lovers against one another in spirited arguments about "Horror Remakes — Reinvented Classics, or Modern Abominations" and the like. Debators unable to resolve their differences with words then stepped into the boxing ring to settle things with fists.
 Closing party, sponsored by the film City of Ember was held at Longhorn Caverns. Bill Murray attended.
 100 Best Kills Party
 Donkey Punch Boat Party
 The Fantastic Feud (Team USA wins!)
 Michael Jackson: Thrill the World, an attempt to break the world record for largest synchronized Thriller dance
 Smokin' Karaoke Apocalypse Party 2008, with live band karaoke

2009
The 2009 festival was held September 24 – October 1. It was the first year of the Fantastic Fest Lifetime Achievement Award, which was given to director Jess Franco. The official sponsors of the 2009 Fantastic Fest were Real D, G4, Dark Sky Films, Best Buy, Stella Artois, Jeremiah Weed, Ain't It Cool News, and Alamo Drafthouse Cinema.

World premieres
 Zombieland, with a Q&A by director Ruben Fleischer and stars Woody Harrelson, Jesse Eisenberg, and Emma Stone
 Gentlemen Broncos (opening night film), with a Q&A by director Jared Hess and stars Jemaine Clement, Michael Angarano Sam Rockwell, and Mike White
 Universal Soldier: Regeneration, with Q&A by star Dolph Lundgren
 REC 2
 Down Terrace with Q&A by director Ben Wheatley
 First Squad
 Macabre
 Mandrill with Q&A by director Ernesto Diaz Espinoza and action star Marko Zaror

U.S. premieres
 Antichrist
 Daybreakers, with Q&A by star Dolph Lundgren
 Survival of the Dead, with Q&A by director George A. Romero
 Human Centipede, with Q&A by director Tom Six
 Doghouse, with Q&A by director Jake West
 Smash Cut
 RoboGeisha
 Duress, with Q&A by director Jordan Barker
 Merantau
 Metropia, with Q&A by director Tarik Saleh
 Sweet Karma, with Q&A by director Andrew Thomas Hunt and star Shera Bechard
 Van Diemen's Land with Q&A by star Mark Leonard Winter
 Tokyo Onlypics
 Under the Mountain

Texas premieres
 Breathless
 Bronson
 Buratino, Son of Pinocchio, with Q&A by director Rasmus Merivoo
 The Children
 Clive Barker's Dread
 Crazy Racer (food/film event)
 Cropsey
 Dirty Mind
 District 13: Ultimatum
 Fireball
 Fish Story
 Groper Train
 Hard Revenge Milly
 House (Hausu)
 The House of the Devil
 Journey to Saturn
 K-20: Legend of the Mask
 Kaifek Murder
 Kamogawa Horumo — Battle League in Kyoto
 Kenny Begins
 Krabat
 The Legend Is Alive
 Love Exposure
 Morphine
 Ninja Assassin
 Paranormal Activity
 Private Eye
 Rampage, with Q&A by director Uwe Boll
 The Revenant
 Salvage
 Soloman Kane
 Stingray Sam, with Q&A by director Cory McAbee
 Survival of the Dead
 Terribly Happy
 A Town Called Panic
 Trick R Treat
 Truffe (food/film event) with Q&A by director Kim Nguyen
 Vampire Girl vs Frankenstein Girl
 Yatterman
 Yesterday

Special screenings
 Cirque du Freak: The Vampire's Assistant, with Q&A by stars John C. Reilly, Chris Massoglia, and Josh Hutcherson
 The Men Who Stare at Goats
 The Imaginarium of Dr. Parnassus
 A Serious Man

Retrospective screenings
A retrospective of the films of Jess Franco in support of his lifetime achievement award:
 Succubus
 Venus in Furs
 Female Vampire (aka The Bare-Breasted Countess)
 Eugenie… The Story of Her Journey into Perversion

Award winners
Next Wave Award, for excellence by an up-and-coming filmmaker
 Best Feature: Down Terrace (Ben Wheatley)
 Best Director: Yang Ik-june (Breathless)
 Best Screenplay: Robin Hill, Ben Wheatley (Down Terrace)
 Best Actor: Hwang Jung-min (Private Eye)
 Best Actress: Shera Bechard (Sweet Karma)

Horror Jury Award, for excellence in the horror genre
 Best Horror Feature: Human Centipede (Tom Six)
 Best Horror Director: Kerry Prior (The Revenant)
 Best Horror Actor: Dieter Laser (Human Centipede)
 Best Horror Actress: Neve McIntosh (Salvage)

Fantastic Fest Jury Award, for excellence outside of the horror genre
 Best Fantastic Feature: Mandrill (Ernesto Diaz-Espinoza)
 Best Fantastic Director: Kim Nguyen (Truffe (film)|Truffe)
 Best Fantastic Screenplay: Tamio Hayashi adapted from Kotaro Isaka (Fish Story)
 Best Fantastic Actor: Marko Zaror (Mandrill)
 Best Fantastic Actress: Chiaki Kuriyama (Kamogawa Horumo)

Horror Shorts Award
 Best Horror Short – "Full Employment" (Thomas Oberlies, Matthias Vogel)
 Special Mention – "Excision" (Richard Bates Jr.)

Fantastic Shorts Award
 Best Fantastic Short – "Terminus" (Trevor Cawood)
 Special Jury Award – "Next Floor" (Denis Villeneuve)

Animated Shorts Award
 Best Animated Short – "I Am So Proud of You" (Don Hertzfeldt)
 Special Mention – "Alma" (Rodrigo Blaas)

Audience Award
 Audience Award, Best Feature: A Town Called Panic (Stephane Aubier, Vincent Patar)
 Audience Award, Honorable Mention: Fish Story
 Audience Award, Honorable Mention: Breathless
 Audience Award, Honorable Mention: The Revenant
 Audience Award, Honorable Mention: Merantau

Highlights
 Watching Uwe Boll fight Alamo Drafthouse owner Tim League at the Fantastic Debates
 Chaos Reigns!
 Brutus and Balzaak Bash party celebrating Gentlemen Broncos opening night party
 Shooting machine guns
 100% medically accurate Q&A by director Tom Six after his film Human Centipede
 Opening of the Highball, the official Fantastic Fest party-place/bowling alley/bar
 Double 3D Dance Party at the Highball
 The Future of 3D: Panels and Presentations event
 The Michael Jackson Dance Party
 Sake, Shochu and Karaoke: Meet the Japanese! – party at Highball
 Return of the Fantastic Feud (and win by Team USA!)

Festivals by year (2010 — 2014)

2010
The 2010 festival was held September 23–30. It was the first year of the Fantastic Arcade, a showcase of independent video games. The presenting sponsors of the 2010 Fantastic Fest were Dell, AMD, RealD, Ambhar Tequila, FearNet.com, Sony PlayStation, and Qriocity.

World premieres

 Agnosia, with a Q&A by director Eugenio Mira
 30 Days Of Night: Dark Days, with Q&A by director Ben Ketai, writers Kiele Sanchez and Steve Niles, and stars Diora Baird and Troy Ruptash
 Undocumented, with Q&A by director Chris Peckover
 Zombie Roadkill with Q&A by director David Green and stars David Dorfman and Thomas Haden Church
 Helldriver, with Q&A by director Yoshihiro Nishimura
 Sharktopus, with Q&A by Roger Corman and Julie Corman
 True Legend, with Q&A by director Yuen Woo-ping
 Troll Hunter with Q&A by director André Øvredal
 Red, with Q&A by star Karl Urban

International premieres
 Norwegian Ninja, with Q&A by director Thomas Cappelen Malling
 Ong Bak 3

US premieres
 Bedevilled with Q&A by director Jang Chul-soo
 Bunraku, with Q&A by director Guy Moshe and star Josh Hartnett
 Cold Fish
 The Corridor, with Q&A by directors Johan Lundborg and Johan Storm, and star Emil Johnsen
 The Dead, with Q&A by writer/directors Howard and Jonathan Ford
 Fatso
 Fire of Conscience
 Hatchet 2, with Q&A by director Adam Green
 A Horrible Way to Die, with Q&A by director Adam Wingard
 The Housemaid (2010 version)
 Julia's Eyes
 Kidnapped, with Q&A by director Miguel Angel Vivas
 The Last Circus, with Q&A by director Álex de la Iglesia
 Legend of the Fist: The Return of Chen Zhen
 Let Me In, with Q&A by director Matt Reeves, and stars Kodi Smit-McPhee, Elias Koteas, and Dylan Minnette
 Naan Kadavul
 Outrage
 Rammbock, with Q&A by director Marvin Kren
 Rare Exports: A Christmas Tale
 Red Hill
 Redline
 I Saw the Devil
 A Somewhat Gentle Man
 Sound of Noise
 I Spit on Your Grave
 Stake Land, with Q&A by director Jim Mickle, and stars Nick Damici, Connor Paolo, and Danielle Harris
 Stone, with Q&A by director John Curran and star Edward Norton
 Transfer
 We Are What We Are

Texas premieres
 13 Assassins
 14 Blades
 Bibliothèque Pascal
 Carancho
 Drones, with Q&A by directors Amber Benson and Adam Busch
 Gallants
 Golden Slumber
 Heartless
 High Lane
 In the Attic, with Q&A by director Jiří Barta
 Ip Man 2
 The Life and Death of a Porno Gang
 The Man From Nowhere
 Mother's Day, with Q&A by director Darren Bousman and star Rebecca De Mornay
 Mutant Girls Squad
 Never Let Me Go
 Primal
 Red White & Blue
 Rubber
 Summer Wars
 The Violent Kind, with Q&A by directors Mitchell Altieri and Phil Flores, and producer Don Lewis
 Woochi

Special screenings
 Buried, with Q&A by star Ryan Reynolds
 Machete Maidens Unleashed
 Nerdcore Rising (to kick off Fantastic Arcade)
 Playing Columbine, played as part of Fantastic Arcade
 Richard Garriott: Man on a Mission, with guest star Richard Garriott
 Enter the Void
 Nightmares – shown as part of Terror Tuesday
 For Your Height Only – presented in Foleyvision to commemorate Machete Maidens Unleashed!

Retrospective screenings
 Class of 1984 – to celebrate the debut of the new book by Zack Carlson, Destroy All Movies
 The Housemaid (1960 version)
 X: The Man with X-Ray Eyes – to commemorate the lifetime achievement award for Roger and Julie Corman
 Snake In Eagle's Shadow – to commemorate the lifetime achievement award for Yuen Wo Ping
 Five Element Ninjas – to commemorate the lifetime achievement award for Yuen Wo Ping
 Joysticks – shown for Weird Wednesday to commemorate Destroy All Movies
 The Twilight People – special Weird Wednesday to honor Machete Maidens Unleashed!
 Re-Animator – with special guest director Stuart Gordon and star Jeffery Combs
 From Beyond – with special guest director Stuart Gordon and star Jeffery Combs

Live Performances
 The Intergalactic Nemesis, a graphic novel radio play by Jason Neulander
 Nevermore, a stage performance by Jeffrey Combs as Edgar Allan Poe, directed by Stuart Gordon
 Independence Day, with live commentary by Master Pancake with Bill Pullman
 SpaceBalls Quote-Along, hosted by Bill Pullman

Award Winners

The Dell/AMD Next Wave Award, for excellence by an up-and-coming filmmaker
 Best Feature: We Are What We Are
 Best Director: Thomas Cappelen Malling (Norwegian Ninja)
 Best Screenplay: Jorge Michel Grau (We Are What We Are)
 Best Actor: Mads Ousdal (Norwegian Ninja)
 Best Actress: Seo Young-hee (Bedevilled)

Horror Jury Award, for excellence in the horror genre
 Best Horror Feature: Kidnapped
 Best Horror Director: Miguel Angel Vivas (Kidnapped)
 Best Horror Screenplay: Simon Barrett (A Horrible Way to Die)
 Best Horror Actor: A.J. Bowen (A Horrible Way to Die)
 Best Horror Actress: Amy Seimetz (A Horrible Way to Die)

Fantastic Fest Jury Award, for excellence outside of the horror genre
 Best Fantastic Feature: The Sound of Noise
 Best Fantastic Director: Pablo Trapero (Carancho)
 Best Fantastic Screenplay: Sion Sono and Yoshiki Takahashi (Cold Fish)
 Best Fantastic Actor: Stellan Skarsgard (A Somewhat Gentle Man)
 Best Fantastic Actress: Martina Gusman (Carancho)

Horror Shorts Award
 Best Horror Short – "Legend of Beaver Dam" (Jerome Sable)
 Special Mention – "Deus Irae" (Pedro Cristiani)

Fantastic Shorts Award
 Best Fantastic Short – "Sorry... I Love You" (Leticia Dolera)

Animated Shorts Award
 Best Animated Short – "Teclopolis" (Javier Mrad)

Audience Award
 Audience Award, Best Feature: Bedevilled (Jang Cheol-soo)
 Audience Award, Honorable Mention: Ip Man 2
 Audience Award, Honorable Mention: Rubber
 Audience Award, Honorable Mention: Golden Slumber

Highlights
 Boys' choir singing the theme from Let Me In at opening night
 Tim League boxing against Michelle Rodriguez (Girl Fight, Avatar)
 Bill Pullman, Elijah Wood, and RZA singing karaoke
 Whole-roasted cow and 500,000 volts of electricity at the closing night party
 100 Best Kills party
 30 Days of Night Flashlight Dance Party
 Criterion "Chaos Reigns" Karaoke Party
 Fantastic Arcade Awards Ceremony/Starcade Competition
 Datapop 4.0 Arcade Closing Night Party
 The FearNet Fantastic Feud (Team USA wins again!)
 Geeks Who Drink presents The Fantastic Fest Quiz
 Nerdeoke!
 Karaoke Apocalypse with live band
 Opening Night Party '80s Dance Party and MC Frontalot Live

2011
The 2011 Fantastic Fest film festival was held September 22–29.

World premieres

 Calibre 9 – Q&A with director Jean-Christian Tassy and producer Axel Guyot
 The Human Centipede 2: Full Sequence (opening night film) – director Tom Six, producer Ilona Six, and actors Ashlynn Yennie, Laurence Harvey, Maddi Black, Katherine Templar, and Emma Lock in attendance
 Manborg – writer/director/producer Steve Kostanski, co-writer/actor Jeremy Gillespie, and actor Andrea Carr in attendance
 Penumbra
 The Squad – Q&A with director Jaime Osorio Marquez
 Zombie Ass

International premieres
 The Devil's Business
 How to Steal 2 Million

U.S. premieres
 Blind
 A Boy and His Samurai
 Bullhead – Q&A with director Michaël R. Roskam
 Bunohan
 Carre Blanc – Director Jean-Baptiste Léonetti, producer Benjamin Mamou, and executive producer Camille Havard Bourdon in attendance
 Comic-Con Episode IV: A Fan's Hope (closing night film) – Producer Harry Knowles, and stars James Darling, Se Young, and Holly Conrad live in person
 The Corridor – Director Evan Kelly, writer Josh MacDonald, producer Mike Masters, and producer Craig Cameron live in person
 The Day – Producer Guy Danella, writer Lucas Passmore, and actor Dominic Monaghan live in person
 Extraterrestrial – Q&A with director Nacho Vigalondo
 Headhunters
 Juan of the Dead – Q&A with director Alejandro Brugués and producer Gervasio Iglesias Macias
 Julia X 3D – Q&A with director P.J. Pettiette, producer Claudie Viguerie, and actor Kevin Sorbo
 Karate-Robo Zaborgar – Q&A with director Noboru Iguchi and makeup/FX supervisor Yoshihiro Nishimura
 Kill Me Please – Q&A with director Olias Barco
 Last Screening – Q&A with actor Pascal Cervo
 Livid
 Michael
 New Kids Turbo – Q&A with actors Huub Smit and Wesley van Gaalen
 Rabies
 Retreat
 Revenge: A Love Story
 Sleep Tight – Q&A with director Jaume Balagueró
 Sleepless Night
 Smuggler
 Snowman's Land
 Snowtown
 Two Eyes Staring
 Urban Explorer
 You Said What? – Q&A with director Patrik Syversen, producer Kjetil Omberg, producer Terje Stromstad, and actor Stig Frode Henriksen
 You're Next – Q&A with writer/producer Simon Barrett, producers Keith Calder and Jess Wu, actors Barbara Crampton, A.J. Bowen, Sharni Vinson, and Nick Tucci

Texas premieres
 A Lonely Place to Die – Q&A with director/co-writer Julian Gilbey and co-writer/editor Will Gilbey
 Angels & Airwaves Presents LOVE – with guest Q&A from Tom Delonge
 Aardvark
 Beyond the Black Rainbow – Q&A with director Panos Cosmatos
 Body Temperature – Q&A with director Takaomi Ogata
 Borderline
 Boys On The Run
 El Infierno
 Elite Squad: The Enemy Within – Q&A with director José Padilha
 Haunters
 The Holding
 Invasion of Alien Bikini
 Klown (Clown) – Q&A with director Mikkel Norgaard
 Knuckle – Q&A with director Ian Palmer and James McDonagh
 Let the Bullets Fly
 Melancholia
 Milocrorze: A Love Story
 Polvora Negra – Q&A with director Kapel Furman
 The Stoker
 Summerland
 Take Shelter
 Underwater Love
 We Need to Talk About Kevin
 Sennentuntschi: Curse of the Alps
 Yakuza Weapon
 The Yellow Sea

Special screenings
 The Skin I Live In – secret screening
 Paranormal Activity 3 – secret screening
 The Innkeepers – premiered at SXSW but also was shown at the closing night of Fantastic Fest

Retrospective screenings
 An American Werewolf in London (1981) – presented by Mondo with special-edition poster and appearance by Stan Winston
 House by the Cemetery – theatrical premiere of the 2K digitally restored version
 Zombie – theatrical premiere of the 2K digitally restored version
 Comin' At Ya! 3D – with producer Tom Stern and star Tony Anthony in attendance
 Movies on Fire: Hong Kong Action Classics
 War of the Worlds – played as part of the Alamo Kid's Club
 Versus – Guest stars Tak Sakaguchi and writer Yudai Yamaguchi

Award winners

Audience Award
 A Boy and His Samurai (Yoshihiro Nakamura)
 Runners-Up: You're Next, Juan of the Dead

AMD & Dell "Next Wave" Spotlight Competition
 Best Picture — Bullhead
 Best Director — Michael R. Roskam (Bullhead)
 Best Screenplay — Josh MacDonald (The Corridor)
 Best Actor — Matthias Schoenaerts (Bullhead)
 Best Actress — Jessica Cole (Aardvark)
 Special Jury Award for Boldness of Vision: Beyond the Black Rainbow

Horror Features
 Best Picture — You're Next
 Best Director — Adam Wingard (You're Next)
 Best Screenplay — Simon Barrett (You're Next)
 Best Actor — Sean Harris (A Lonely Place to Die)
 Best Actress — Sharni Vinson (You're Next)

Fantastic Features
 Best Picture — Milocrorze: A Love Story
 Best Director — Noboru Iguchi (Karate Robo Zaborgar)
 Best Screenplay — Olafur Egilsson, Grimur Haonarson (Summerland)
 Best Actor — Julián Villagrán (Extraterrestrial)
 Best Actress — Sawa Masaki (Underwater Love)

Gutbuster Comedy Features
 Best Picture – Clown
 Best Director — Steffen Haars, Flip Van Der Kuil (New Kids Turbo)
 Best Screenplay — Casper Christensen, Frank Hvam (Clown)

Short Fuse: Horror Shorts
 Winner: "How to Rid Your Lover of a Negative Emotion Caused By You" (Nadia Litz)
 Runner-up: "The Unliving" (Hugo Lilj)
 Special Jury Award for Outstanding Achievement in Special Effects and General Badassery: "Brutal Relax" (David Muñoz, Rafa Dengrá, Adrián Cardona)

Fantastic Shorts
 Best Fantastic Short: "Decapoda Shock" (Javier Chillón)
 Runner-up: "All Men Are Called Robert" (Marc-Henri Boulier)
 Special Jury Mention for Acting: Robert Picardo ("The Candidate")

Drawn and Quartered: Animated Shorts
 Best Animated Short: "The Last Norwegian Troll" (Pjotr Sapegin)
 Runner-up: Lazarov ("NIETOV")

Highlights
 James Quinn McDonagh versus Tim League at the Fantastic Fest Debates
 The opening night film Human Centipede 2 had an ambulance on standby outside and handed out barf bags
 Opening night party in celebration of Human Centipede 2 with live music from the Charles Edward Cheese band
 Fantastic Feud (Team USA continues win streak over Team International)
 Fantastic Arcade ran Sept. 22–24
 Japan Night: Chaos Reigns Karaoke Party
 100 Best Kills featuring the best of audience submitted movie deaths
 Karaoke Apocalypse – karaoke with a live band
 Fantastic Trivia presented by Geeks Who Drink
 Fantastic Fest Closing Night Party: Superhero Carnival – featuring Aquaman’s Ocean, The Flash’s Mountain Race Challenge, Batman’s Boxing Battle, Spider-man’s Wall of Webbing, Superman’s House of Flight and carnival food

2012
The 2012 Fantastic Fest Film Festival took place September 20–27. This was the last year Fantastic Fest was held at the Highball and South Lamar theater before it was all remodeled.

World premieres

 The ABCs of Death
 The American Scream – Q&A with director Michael Paul Stephenson, producer Lindsay Stephenson, and haunters Manny Souza and Victor Bariteau and family
 Besties 
 Black Out
 Bring Me the Head of the Machine Gun Woman – Q&A with director Ernesto Diaz
 The Collection – Q&A with actress Emma Fitzpatrick
 The Conspiracy – Q&A with Director Christopher MacBride, producer Lee Kim, actor/producer Aaron Poole, cinematographer Ian Anderson, and actor Jim Gilbert
 Danger 5
 The Exorcist in the 21st Century
 Frankenweenie – (opening night film) – Q&A with Tim Burton and voice actors Winona Ryder and Martin Landau
 The Greatest Movie Ever Rolled – Q&A with director Ryan Polito, star Doug Benson, producer Sharon Everitt, and cinematographer Will Deloney
 Hellfjord
 Plan C
 Red Dawn – (closing night film) – Q&A with stars Josh Peck and Adrianne Palicki, director Dan Bradley, and producers Tripp Vinson and Beau Flynn
 Tebana Sankichi: Snot Rockets
 Universal Soldier: Day of Reckoning – Q&A with actor Scott Adkins and Mariah Bonner

International premieres
 Two Rabbits (Dois Coehilos)

U.S. premieres
 Aftershock - Q&A with director Nicolás López and actor/producer Eli Roth
 American Mary – Q&A with the Soska Sisters and actress Tristan Risk
 Antiviral
 Berberian Sound Studio
 Cockneys vs. Zombies – Q&A with director Matthias Hoene and writer James Moran
 Combat Girls
 Come Out and Play
 Crave – Q&A with director Charles de Lauzirika and actor Josh Lawson
 Dead Sushi – Q&A with director Noboru Iguchi, producer Mana Fukui, and actress Rina Takeda
 Dom: A Russian Family
 Errors of the Human Body – Q&A with actor Michael Eklund, director Jennifer Phang, actor/co-producer Jacqueline Kim, and technical director Jon Destoppeleire
 Everybody in Our Family
 Fuck Up – Q&A with director Oystein Karlsen, producer Anders Tangen, cinematographer Pal Bugge Haagenrud, and actor Jon Oigarden
 Henge
 Here Comes the Devil – Q&A with director Adrián García Bogliano, producer Andrea Quiroz Hernandez, and actor Francisco Barreiro
 Holy Motors
 I Declare War – Q&A with director Rob Wilson and producer Lewin Webb
 La Memoria del Muerto (Memory of the Dead) – Q&A with director Javier Diment and writer Martin Blousson
 Lee's Adventure
 Looper – Q&A with director Rian Johnson
 My Amityville Horror – Q&A with director Eric Walter and producers Andrea Adams and Christine Irons
 New Kids Nitro – Q&A with directors Steffen Haars and Flip van der Kuil, as well as actors Huub Smit and Wesley van Gaalen
 Outrage Beyond
 Pusher
 Tai Chi 0
 Tower Block – Q&A with director Ronnie Thompson
 Vanishing Waves
 Vegetarian Cannibal
 The Warped Forest
 Young Gun in the Time

Texas premieres
 Cold Blooded
 Cold Steel – Q&A with director David Wu
 Dredd – Q&A with writer/director Alex Garland, actress Olivia Thirlby, and actor Karl Urban
 The Final Member – Q&A with directors Jonah Bekhor and Zach Math
 Flicker
 Graceland – Q&A with director Ron Morales and producer Rebecca Lundgren
 Hail
 The History of Future Folk – Q&A with producer/co-director Jeremy Kipp Walker, writer/co-director John Mitchell, and actors Nil d-Aulaire and Jay Klaitz
 The Kings of Pigs
 No Rest for the Wicked
 Paris By Night
 Room 237
 Taped
 Unit 7
 Vulgaria
 Wrong

Austin premieres
 Doomsday Book

Special screenings
 Cloud Atlas – (secret screening)
 Sightseers – (secret screening)
 Sinister – premiered at SXSW; then had a special screening at Fantastic Fest
 Paranormal Activity 4 – work-in-progress print with a Q&A with actress Katie Featherston and co-director Henry Joost

Retrospective screenings
 The Entity (1982) – repertory screening as part of the House of Psychotic Women series
 The Mafu Cage (1978) – repertory screening as part of the House of Psychotic Women series
 Miami Connection (1987) – Q&A with actor/producer Grandmaster YK, and actors Joe Diamond, Maurice Smith, Angelo Jannotti, and Vince Hirsch
 Secret Ceremony (1968) repertory screening as part of the House of Psychotic Women series
 The Shining (1980) – played simultaneously back and forth over each other
 Wake in Fright (1971)

Award winners

Audience Award

 I Declare War (dir. Robert Wilson and Jason Lapeyre)

AMD "Next Wave" Spotlight Competition
 Best Picture: Flicker (dir. Patrik Eklund)
 Best Director: Charles de Lauzirika (Crave)
 Best Screenplay: Max Porcelijn (Plan C)
 Best Actor: Michael Eklund (Errors of the Human Body)
 Best Actress: Alina Levshin (Combat Girls)

Fantastic Features
 Best Picture: Vanishing Waves (dir. Kristina Buozyte)
 Best Director: Kristina Buozyte (Vanishing Waves)
 Best Screenplay: Bruno Samper, Kristina Buozyte (Vanishing Waves)
 Best Actor: Rene Bitorajac (Vegetarian Cannibal)
 Best Actress: Jurga Jutaite (Vanishing Waves)

Horror Features
 Best Picture: Here Comes the Devil (dir. Adrián García Bogliano)
 Best Screenplay: Adrián García Bogliano (Here Comes the Devil)
 Best Director: Adrián García Bogliano (Here Comes the Devil)
 Special Mention: Hajime Ohata (Henge)
 Best Actor: Francisco Barreiro (Here Comes the Devil)
 Best Actress: Laura Caro (Here Comes the Devil)
 Special Mention: Katherine Isabel (American Mary)

Gutbuster Comedy Features
 Best Picture: New Kids Nitro (dir. Steffen Haars & Flip Van der Kuil)
 Best Director: Dario Russo (Danger 5)
 Best Screenplay: John Mitchell (The History of Future Folk)
 Best Actor: Chapman To (Vulgaria)
 Best Actress: Rina Takeda (Dead Sushi)

Documentary Features
 Best Picture: The American Scream (dir. Michael Stephenson)
 Best Director: Rodney Ascher (Room 237)

Short Fuse: Horror Shorts
 Winner: "At the Formal" (Andrew Kavanagh, Australia)
 Runner-up: "The Sleepover" (Chris Cullari, USA)

Fantastic Shorts
 Winner: "Record/Play" (Jesse Atlas, USA)
 Runner-up: "Love" (Kaveh Nabatian, Canada)

Drawn and Quartered: Animated Shorts
 Winner: "Bendito Machine IV" (Jossie Malis, Spain)
 Runner-up: "Tram" (Michaela Pavlátová, Czech Republic)

Highlights
 Front of Drafthouse Lamar painted up for Frankenweenie world premiere
 Special Frankenweenie screening for dogs and their owners
 Chaos Reigns Karaoke Party with reunited Dragon Sound at the Highball
 Opening night Monsters Ball where attendees were encouraged to wear their favorite silver-screen monster costume
The American Scream Homemade Haunted House
 Datapop party celebrating 8-bit music and culture for Fantastic Arcade
 "Hellfjord" Norwegian Party
 Tim League fighting YK Kim at the Fantastic Debates
 Closing night party was Red Dawn themed. The Austin American Legion was decorated as a maximum-security prison with free prison tattoos and head shaving
 Fantastic Feud (Team International's first victory over Team USA)

2013
The 2013 festival was hosted for the first time at the brand new Alamo Drafthouse Lakeline location from September 19–26.

World premieres

 Coherence
 Detective Downs
 Goldberg and Eisenberg
 Grand Piano
 Greatful Dead
 LFO
 Machete Kills (opening night)
 Ninja: Shadow of a Tear
 Ragnarok
 Septic Man

North American premieres
 Chanthaly
 The Congress
 A Field in England
 Journey to the West: Conquering the Demons
 Kid's Police
 Maruyama the Middle Schooler
 Mirage Men
 Miss Zombie
 Monsoon Shootout
 Nothing Bad Can Happen
 Our Heroes Died Tonight
 Patrick
 She Wolf
 The Zero Theorem

U.S. premieres
 Afflicted
 Almost Human
 Blue Ruin
 Borgman
 Commando: A One Man Army
 Confession of Murder
 The Fake
 Gatchaman
 Love Eternal
 Man of Tai Chi
 Moebius
 Mood Indigo
 On The Job
 Proxy
 R100
 Rigor Mortis
 The Sacrament
 "Sleep Clinic"
 The Strange Colour of Your Body's Tears
 Vic + Flo Saw a Bear
 We Gotta Get Out of This Place
 Why Don't You Play in Hell?
 Witching & Bitching
 Wolf

Texas premieres
 Big Bad Wolves
 The Dirties
 Escape from Tomorrow
 Fatal
 Halley
 Hentai Kamen: Forbidden Super Hero
 Jodorowsky's Dune
 Metallica Through the Never
 Narco Cultura
 Nightbreed: The Cabal Cut
 Northwest
 The Resurrection of a Bastard
 O'Apostolo
 We Are What We Are

Austin premieres
 Eega
 Tales from the Organ Trade

Special screenings
 Cheap Thrills – special encore presentation
 The Green Inferno – (secret screening)
 Gravity – (secret screening)
 Child of God – (secret screening)
 The Rundown – a movie interruption from Doug Benson

Retrospective screenings
 All the Boys Love Mandy Lane
 Timecrimes – special screening with Mondo poster and vinyl of soundtrack with director Nacho Vigalondo
 The Devils

Award Winners

Audience Award
 Best Documentary: Jodorowsky’s Dune (director Frank Pavich)
 Best Narrative Feature: Blue Ruin (director Jeremy Saulnier)

"Next Wave" Spotlight
 Best Picture: The Dirties (director Matt Johnson)
 Best Director: Oren Carmi (Goldberg and Eisenberg)
 Best Screenplay: James Ward Byrkit (Coherence)
 Best Actor: Yorick van Wageningen (The Resurrection of a Bastard)
 Best Actress: Swantje Kohlhof (Nothing Bad Can Happen)

Fantastic Features
 Best Picture: The Congress (director Ari Folman)
 Best Director: David Perrault (Our Heroes Died Tonight)
 Best Screenplay: Ari Folman (The Congress)
 Best Actor: Svein André Hofsø Myhre (Detective Downs)
 Best Actress: Robin Wright (The Congress)

Horror Features
 Best Picture: Afflicted (directors Derek Lee and Clif Prowse)
 Best Director: Derek Lee and Clif Prowse (Afflicted)
 Best Screenplay: Derek Lee and Clif Prowse (Afflicted)
 Best Actor: Jason David Brown (Septic Man)
 Best Actress: Julia Garner (We Are What We Are)

Gutbuster Comedy Features
 Best Picture: Why Don't You Play In Hell (director Sion Sono)
 Best Director: Sion Sono (Why Don't You Play In Hell)
 Best Screenplay: Kankurô Kudô (Maruyama The Middle Schooler)
 Best Actor: Fuku Suzuki (Kid’s Police)
 Best Actress: Qi Shu (Journey To the West: Conquering The Demon)

Documentary Features
 Best Picture: Jodorowsky’s Dune (director Frank Pavich)
 Best Director: Shaul Schwarz (Narco Cultura)

Short Fuse: Horror Shorts
 Winner: Remember Me (director Jean-François Asselin)
 Runner-up: Perfect Drug (director Toon Aerts)

Fantastic Shorts
 Winner: Beasts in the Real World (director Sol Friedman)
 Runner-up: My Pain Is Worse Than Your Pain (director Adam Hall)

Drawn and Quartered: Animated Shorts
 Winner: The Sad House (director Sofia Catalina Carrillo Ramírez)
 Runner-up: Kick-Heart (director Masaaki Yuasa)

Fantastic Arcade
 Best in Show and Audience Choice: Samurai Gunn (developed by Teknopants)

Highlights
 Danger Gods!: The True Daredevils of Hollywood Legend – live stunt show
 Fantastic Arcade panels and tournaments
 Opening Night Party: Machete Don't Stop
 Fantastic Fest presents Doug Loves Movies
 Chaos Reigns!!! Karaoke Party
 The Fantastic Debates Presented by Man of Tai Chi
Cards Against Humanity Happy Hour
 Fantastic Arcade VideoHeroeS Tournament and Arcade Awards
 You Guys Like Tequila?: The Fantastic Arcade After Party
 Nerd Rap Throwdown
 Fantastic Feud (win by Team USA)
 Fantastic Trivia presented by Geeks Who Drink
 Metal Meltdown with Karaoke Apocalypse – live band karaoke
 Closing Night Party

2014
The 2014 festival returned to the Alamo Drafthouse South Lamar location from September 18–25 for the 10-year anniversary.

World premieres

 The ABCs of Death 2
 Danger 5 (Season 2)
 Relocos y Repasados
 Horsehead
 Dios Local
 Wyrmwood
 The Absent One
 Dwarves Kingdom
 Felt
 I Am Here
 I Am Trash
 Purgatory
 Redeemer
 Everly
 From the Dark
 Future Shock! The Story of 2000AD
 The Hive
 My Life Directed by Nicolas Winding Refn
 Confetti of the Mind: The Short Films of Nacho Vigolando

North American premieres
 Whispers Behind the Wall
 El Incidente
 Naturaleza Muerte (Still Life)
 Tombville
 Tommy
 As Seen by the Rest
 Free Fall
 Necrophobia 3D
 Realiti
 Wastelander Panda:Exile
 Darkness by Day
 Lost Soul: The Doomed Journey of Richard Stanley’s Island of Dr. Moreau
 Nymphomaniac (Director’s Cut)

U.S. premieres
 Alleluia
 Bro’s Before Ho’s
 The Man in the Orange Jacket
 Norway
 Tusk
 V/H/S:Viral
 The Creeping Garden
 The Editor
 Electric Boogaloo: The Wild, Untold Story of Cannon Films
 Force Majeure
 Nightcrawler
 Over Your Dead Body
 Spring
 The Tale of Princess Kaguya
 Tokyo Tribe
 The Treatment
 Automata
 Cub
 The Duke of Burgundy
 Haemoo
 Hardkor Disco
 I Am a Knife With Legs
 It Follows
 Let Us Prey
 Shrew’s Nest
 The Tribe
 Waste Land
 When Animals Dream
 The World of Kanako

Texas premieres
 The Babadook
 Closer to God
 Jacky in the Kingdom of Women
 Blind
 Dead Snow: Red vs. Dead
 In Order of Disappearance
 No Man’s Land

Austin premieres
 Man from Reno
 Horns

Special screenings
 Kung Fu Elliot – Fantastic Fest premiere
 John Wick – special gala screening
 Goodnight Mommy – secret screening
 Miami Connection – a movie interruption from Doug Benson
 The Look of Silence – a Drafthouse Alliance special screening
 The Island of Dr. Moreau – Master Pancake screening

Retrospective screenings
 Bugsy Malone – Kid Power! book launch
 Death Wish III
 The Astrologer
 Ninja III: The Domination
 The Soultangler

Award winners

Audience Award
The Tale of Princess Kaguya (director Isao Takahata)

"Next Wave" Spotlight
 Best Picture: It Follows (director David Robert Mitchell)
 Best Director: Miroslav Slaboshpitsky (The Tribe)
 Best Screenplay: David Robert Mitchell (It Follows)
 Best Actor: Lou Taylor Pucci (Spring)
 Best Actress: Amy Everson (Felt)

Fantastic Features
 Best Picture: Alleluia (director Fabrice Du Welz)
 Best Director: Fabrice Du Welz (ALLELUIA)
 Best Screenplay: Tetsuya Nakashima, Miako Tadano and Nobuhiro Monma (THE WORLD OF KANAKO)
 Best Actor: Laurent Lucas (ALLELUIA)
 Best Actress: Lola Dueñas (ALLELUIA)

Horror Features
 Best Picture: THE BABADOOK (directed Jennifer Kent)
 Best Screenplay: Jennifer Kent (THE BABADOOK)
 Best Director: Martín De Salvo (DARKNESS BY DAY)
 Best Actor: Noah Wiseman (THE BABADOOK)
 Best Actress: Essie Davis (THE BABADOOK)

Gutbuster Comedy Features
 Best Picture: DEAD SNOW 2: RED VS DEAD (director by Tommy Wirkola)
 Best Director: Hans Petter Moland (IN ORDER OF DISAPPEARANCE)
 Best Screenplay: Vegar Hoel, Stig Frode Henriksen and Tommy Wirkola (DEAD SNOW 2: RED VS DEAD)
 Best Actor: Pål Sverre Hagen (IN ORDER OF DISAPPEARANCE)
 Best Actress: Sylvia Hoeks (BROS BEFORE HOS)

Documentary Features
 Best Picture: KUNG FU ELLIOT (director Jaret Belliveau)
 Best Director: Tim Grabham, Jasper Sharp (THE CREEPING GARDEN)

Short Fuse: Horror Shorts'
 Winner: THE STOMACH directed by Ben Steiner
 Runner-up: INVADERS directed by Jason Kupfer

Fantastic Shorts
 Winner: THE VOICE THIEF directed by Adan Jodorowsky
 Runner-up: MY FATHER IS A BIRD (director Boaz Debby) and SOLITUDO (director Alice Lowe)

Drawn and Quartered: Animated Shorts
 Winner: THE CHAPERONE (director Fraser Munden)
 Runner-up: DAY 40 (director Sol Friedman)

Fantastic Arcade
 Best in Show: BANANA CHALICE (developed by Kyle Reimergartin)

‘Mercado Fantastico’
 Gold Prize: HAVANA VAMPIRE TERRITORY (director Carlos Lechuga) and THE TURNED (director Andrés Rosende) 
 Silver Prize: FIERCE (director Francisco Lorite) 
 Bronze Prize: HURT (director Pablo Proenza) 
 Special Jury Mention for "Keeping the Spirit of the 80's Alive": THE SHADOWDWELLERS (producer Erick Salomon) 
 Jury Award for Work in Progress, and Chemistry Award: FRONDOSO EDEN DEL CORAZON (director Juan Manuel Fodde) 
 Morbido/Latam Consultation Award: EAT ME (director David Michán)

Highlights
 Maltin’s Game Tournament hosted by Leonard Maltin
 The Meltdown with Jonah and Kumail
 Fantastic Debates
 Nerd Rap Throwdown
 Opening Night: 10th Birthday Armageddon (featuring food fight and human piñata)
 Fantastic Feud (winner: Team USA)
 Fantastic Arcade
 Chaos Reigns! Karaoke Party
 Metal Meltdown with Karaoke Apocalypse
 Fantastic Fest ABCs of Closing Night Party

Festivals by year (2015 — 2019)

2015
The 2015 festival returned to the Alamo Drafthouse South Lamar location from Sept. 24–Oct. 1.

World premieres

 Bone Tomahawk
 Darling
 Dirty Romance
 Gridlocked
 La Granja
 Lazer Team
 Man Vs Snake
 The Passing
 Sensoria
 The Similars
 What We Become
 Zinzana

North American premieres
 The Brand New Testament
 Coz Ov Moni 2
 Der Bunker
 In Search of Ultra Sex
 Lovemilla
 Speed

U.S. premieres
 April and the Extraordinary World
 Assassination Classroom
 Baskin
 The Club
 Demon
 German Angst
 Green Room
 High-Rise
 The Lobster
 Love and Peace
 Ludo
 The Missing Girl
 Office
 Remake, Remix, Rip-off
 Stand By for Tape Back Up

Texas premieres
 The Keeping Room
 L'affaire SK1
 The Witch
 Yakuza Apocalypse

Special screenings
 The Martian
 The Invitation

Award winners

Audience Award
 1st Place – Green Room (director Jeremy Saulnier)
 2nd Place – Liza the Fox Fairy (director Károly Ujj Mészáros)
 3rd Place – Stand By for Tape Back-Up (director Ross Sutherland)

"Next Wave" Spotlight
 Best Picture: Der Bunker (director Nikias Chryssos)
 Best Director: Can Evrenol for Baskin

Fantastic Features
 Best Picture: The Club
 Best Director: Duke Johnson and Charlie Kaufman for Anomalisa

Horror Features
 Best Picture: Demon
 Best Director: Joe Begos for THE MIND’S EYE

Comedy Features
 Best Picture: THE BRAND NEW TESTAMENT
 Best Director:  Anders Thomas Jensen for MEN & CHICKEN

Documentary Features
 Best Picture: MAN VS SNAKE
 Best Director: Heath Cozens for DOGLEGS

Horror Shorts
 Best Picture: SISTER HELL
 Best Director: Ryan Spindell for THE BABYSITTER MURDERS

Fantastic Shorts
 Best Picture: MOVIES IN SPACE
 Best Director: Jeremy David White for ENHANCED

Fantastic Arcade
 Best in Show: SECRET LEGEND developed by Andrew Shouldice
 Audience Award Winner: SUPER RUSSIAN ROULETTE developed by Andrew Reitano

Mercado Fantastico
 1st Place: THE DUMP by Fernando Montes de Oca and Xavier Sánchez Mercado
 2nd Place: PARADISE HILLS by Alice Waddington
 3rd Place: EL GIGANTE by Gigi Saul Guerrero

FANTASTIC BUMPER COMPETITION – Presented by SourceFed Nerd
 THE JURY directed by Joe Nicolosi

2016 
The 2016 festival took place at the Alamo Drafthouse South Lamar from Sept. 22–29.

World premieres 

 Split – with M. Night Shyamalan in attendance
 24x26: A Movie About Movie Posters
 A Dark Song
 Dearest Sister
 The Dwarves Must Be Crazy
 Jungle Trap
 Phantasm: Ravager
 The Void
 Better Watch Out
 Sweet, Sweet Lonely Girl
 The Zodiac Killer
 Another Wolfcop
 Bad Black
 Boyka: Undisputed
 Fashionista
 The Osiris Child: Science Fiction Volume One

International Premieres
 Popoz
 Aalavandhan
 The High Frontier
 Shimauma
 Terry Teo
 Young Offenders
 The Truth Beneath

North American Premieres
 Chunyuki
 Call of Heroes
 Don't Kill It – with Dolph Lundgren in attendance
 Kammattipadam
 The Red Turtle
 Re:Born
 S Is for Stanley
 Salt and Fire

U.S. Premieres
 Arrival
 Asura
 Assassination Classroom – Graduation
 The Bad Batch
 Zoology
 Dog Eat Dog
 Elle
 The Girl With All the Gifts
 The Handmaiden
 Nova Seed
 Raw
 Sadako vs. Kayako
 Toni Erdmann
 The Age of Shadows
 The Autopsy of Jane Doe
 Colossal
 Headshot
 The Invisible Guest
 My Entire Highschool is Sinking Into the Sea

Texas Premieres
 Helmut Berger, Actor
 They Call Me Jeeg Robot
 A Monster Calls
 Hentai Kamen 2: The Abnormal Crisis
 The Lure

Regional Premieres
 Bugs
 The Eyes of My Mother

Austin Premieres
 Rats

Repertory Screenings
 Khalnayak
 Magadheera

Special Screenings
 The Greasy Strangler
 Miss Peregrine's Home for Peculiar Children
 Phantasm: Remastered
 Goke: Body Snatcher from Hell
 Ash vs. Evil Dead – with Bruce Campbell, Ray Santiago, Dana DeLorenzo and Lee Majors in attendance
 Westworld

Award Winners 
Audience Award
Bad Black – Directed by Nabwana Igg
 1st Runner Up – Nirvanna The Band The Show – Directed by Matt Johnson
 2nd Runner Up – Raw – Directed by Julia Ducournau
"Next Wave" Features
 Best Picture:  ZOOLOGY directed by Ivan I. Tverdovsky
 Best Director: Julia Ducournau for RAW
 Special Mention for Fantastic Spirit: THE LURE
Fantastic Features
 Best Picture: COLOSSAL directed by Nacho Vigalondo
 Best Director: Amat Escalante for THE UNTAMED
Horror Features
 Best Picture: THE AUTOPSY OF JANE DOE directed by André Øvredal
 Best Director: Colm McCarthy for THE GIRL WITH ALL THE GIFTS
Comedy Features
 Best Picture:  DOWN UNDER directed by Abraham Forsythe
 Best Director: Abraham Forsythe for DOWN UNDER
 Special Mention for Best Comedy Debut: THE YOUNG OFFENDERS
Action Features
 Best Picture: AGE OF SHADOWS directed by Kim Jee-woon
 Best Director: Nabwana IGG for BAD BLACK
 Special Mention for Best Action: CALL OF HEROES
Documentary Features
 Best Picture: Original Copy directed by Florian Heinzen-Ziob & Georg Heinzen
 Best Director: Florian Heinzen-Ziob and Georg Heinzen for Original Copy

Short Fuse: Horror Shorts
 Best Picture: CURVE directed by Tim Egan
 Best Director : Tim Egan for CURVE
 Special Mention: OVERTIME
 Special Mention: Najarra Townsend, lead actress in THE STYLIST
Fantastic Shorts
 Best Picture: SUMMER CAMP ISLAND directed by Julia Pott
 Best Director : Chris Mitchell & Yoav Lester for IRON SPYDER
Shorts With Legs
 Best Picture: PACO directed by Catalina Jordan Alvarez
 Best Director: Calvin Reeder for THE PROCEDURE
 Special Mention for Best Meal: THE WORM
Fantastic Arcade
 Most Fantastic: Everything by David O'Reilly
 Audience Choice: Loot Rascals by Hollow Ponds
Fantastic Bumper Competition
 JACK SKELLINGTON IN THE BOX directed by Roman Fruehan

Highlights 
 Satanic Panic Escape Room
 Fantastic Feud
 Fantastic Debates
 Doug Loves Movies
The Meltdown with Jonah and Kumail
 Itchy-O
Maltin at the Movies: Tim Burton
 Puke and Explode! – The Fantastic Fest Eating Contest
 Dishoom Reigns Karaoke Party
Maltin at the Movies: Bruce Campbell
 Nerd Rap
 Rogue One for the Road: The Star Wars Drink Competition
 Everything Is Terrible!
 100 Best Kills: 100 Worst Births
 Geeks Who Drink
 Doug Benson Movie Interruption: The Monster Squad
 Dark Corner VR
 Catatonic
 Mule
 Burlap

2017 
The 2017 festival took place at the Alamo Drafthouse South Lamar from Sept. 21–28. The event attracted attention due to the disclosure that Tim League had re-hired Devin Faraci as a writer even though Faraci resigned from Birth.Movies.Death in 2016 after he was accused of sexual assault. Faraci's re-hiring prompted the resignation of Todd Brown, Fantastic Fest's director of international programming. Alamo Drafthouse/Fantastic Fest severed ties with Harry Knowles after sexual harassment/assault allegations pertaining to him also surfaced.

World Premieres 

 1922
 Anna and the Apocalypse
Juvenile
Maus
Applecart
Haunters: The Art of the Scare
 Salyut-7
 Tigers Are Not Afraid
 Wheelman
World of Tomorrow Episode Two: The Burden of Other People's Thoughts
Ichi the Killer (4k Restoration)
 Take It Out in Trade
 All You Can Eat Buddha
Wizard (Matwetwe)
Hagazussa

International Premieres
The Originals
3Ft. Ball and Souls
 Baasha
Rabbit
 V.I.P.
North American Premieres
Ron Goossens: Low-Budget Stuntman
Top Knot Detective
 Before We Vanish
Blue My Mind
Firstborn
Good Manners
 Jupiter's Moon
The Line
 Mary and the Witch's Flower
 The Merciless
Generatie B
Pin Cushion
See You Up There

U.S. Premieres
 Blade of the Immortal
 Brawl in Cell Block 99
Cold Hell
Black Spot (Zone Blanche)
Bodied
Dan Dream
 The Death of Stalin
 Gerald's Game
 Jailbreak
 The Killing of a Sacred Deer
King Cohen
 The Square
 Tiger Girl
 The Cured
 Darkland
 Five Fingers for Marseilles
Junk Head
 Les Affames
 Let the Corpses Tan
 Letterkenny
 Mom and Dad
The Prince of Nothingwood
 Professor Marston & the Wonder Women
Radius
Revenge
 Under the Tree
Vampire Clay
 Downsizing
1%
Tabula Rasa

Texas Premieres
 Mon Mon Mon Monsters
Rift
 Thelma
Vidar the Vampire
 The Endless
 My Friend Dahmer
 Bad Genius
 Bat Pussy
Love and Saucers

Repertory Screenings
 The Nude Vampire
Anyab
 Maniac Cop 2
Special Screenings
 Gemini
Doug Benson Movie Interruption: Babe: Pig in the City

Award Winners 
Audience Award Winner
 Audience Award Winner: BODIED directed by Joseph Kahn
 1st Runner-Up: GILBERT directed by Neil Berkeley
 2nd Runner-Up: WORLD OF TOMORROW EPISODE TWO directed by Don Hertzfeldt

"Next Wave" Features
 Best Picture: Hagazussa: A Heathen's Curse directed by Lukas Feigelfeld
 Best Director: Takahide Hori for JUNK HEAD
 Special Mention for both Five Fingers for Marseilles and Maus

Fantastic Features
 Best Picture: My Friend Dahmer directed by Marc Meyers
 Best Director: Kornél Mundruczó for Jupiter's Moon
Special Mention for both Tiger Girl and Good Manners

Horror Features
 Best Picture: THE CURED directed by David Freyne
 Best Director: Issa López for TIGERS ARE NOT AFRAID
 Special Mention for Most Creative FX and Innovative Approach to Vampire Mythology to VAMPIRE CLAY
Comedy Features
 Best Picture:  THE SQUARE directed by Ruben Östlund
 Best Director: Hafsteinn Gunnar Sigurðsson for UNDER THE TREE
 Special Mention for Sheer Ballsiness to RON GOOSMAN’S LOW BUDGET STUNT MAN
Thriller Features
 Best Picture: BAD GENIUS directed by Nattawut Poonpiriya
 Best Director: Park Hoon-jung for V.I.P.
 Special Mention for Building a Cinematic Universe on a Budget: The Endless

Documentary Features
 Best Picture and Best Director: BRIMSTONE & GLORY directed by Viktor Jakovleski
 Special Mention to Love and Saucers

Short Fuse: Horror Shorts
 Best Picture: VOYEUR directed by Charlotte Lam, Claire Stradwick
 Best Director : Gonçalo Almeida for THURSDAY NIGHT
 Special Mention to CRESWICK
Fantastic Shorts
 Best Picture: THE BURDEN directed by Niki Lindroth von Bahr
 Special Mention for Biggest Face Melter to KAIJU BUNRAKU
Shorts With Legs
 Best Picture and Best Director: THE TESLA WORLD LIGHT directed by Matthew Rankin
 Special Mention to BEANS by director Maxwell Nalevansky
Fantastic Bumper Competition
 SNAP SNAP directed by Felicia Rein

Highlights 
 Fantastic Debates
 Fantastic Feud
Maltin at the Movies: Elijah Wood
Maltin at the Movies: Vince Vaughn
 Puke and Explode! – The Fantastic Fest Eating Contest
 Nerd Rap Contest
 Chaos Reigns Karaoke Party
 Opening Night Pajama Party Jam
 Transference VR
 The Monster Squad Mega Mash
 The Thing: Infection at Outpost 31 Game Play
 Teen Panel: Anna and the Apocalypse
 The Glassed Jedi: Star Wars Drink Competition
 Everything is Terrible: The Great Satan
 Cadaverous Closing Night Party with Itchy-O

2018 
The 2018 festival took place at the Alamo Drafthouse South Lamar from Sept. 20–27.

World Premieres

Bros: After the Screaming Stops
All the Gods in the Sky
Apostle
Between Worlds
Bloodline
The Boat
Feral
Folklore
Mongdal
Toyol
FP2: Beats of Rage
Girls with Balls
House of Sweat and Tears
I Was a Teenage Serial Killer – new restoration
Level 16
Maniac – new 4K restoration
Mary Jane's Not a Virgin Anymore – new 4K restoration
The Night Comes for Us
Overlord
The Perfection
Savage
Starfish
Strike, Dear Mistress, and Cure His Heart
Sudden Fury – new restoration
The Trip Back
The Unthinkable
You Might be the Killer

International Premieres

Madam Yankelova's Fine Literature Club
Werewolf

North American Premieres

Suspiria
The Bouncer
Dachra
Deadly Games
Fugue
Keep an Eye Out
Knife + Heart
The Man Who Killed Don Quixote
May the Devil Take You
Modest Heroes: Ponoc Short Films Theatre, Vol 1
Murder Me, Monster
Open 24 Hours
Quit Your Life
School's Out
When the Trees Fall
White Fire – 2K restoration
The Wolf House

U.S. Premieres

The Angel
Cam
Climax
Close Enemies
Dog
Donnybrook
Halloween
Hold the Dark
In Fabric
The Innocent
I Used to Be Normal: A Boyband Fangirl Story
Ladyworld
Luz
Mid90s
Shadow
The Standoff at Sparrow Creek
The Night Shifter
Terrified
Tumbbad
Under the Silver Lake
The Wind

Regional Premieres

Ban Geum-ryeon
The Blood of Wolves
Deadwax
Laika
Violence Voyager
The World is Yours

Texas Premieres

Bad Times at the El Royale
The Bastards' Fig Tree
Border
Burning
Chained for Life
Destroyer
Dogman
An Evening with Beverly Luff Linn
Life After Flash
Lords of Chaos
One Cut of the Dead
Piercing
The Quake
Slut in a Good Way

Austin Premieres

The Guilty
Holiday

Retrospective Screenings 

Blood Lake
Flash Gordon

Shorts

Fantastic Shorts 

Hi-Five the Cactus
O.I.
Petite Avarie
Pizzamonster
Puppet Master
Space Flower
Squirrel

Short Fuse Presented by Stage 13 

Acid
Chowboys: An American Folktale
Drum Wave
A Haunting
Helsinki Mansplaining Massacre
Riley Was Here
Songbird
Special Day
Stigma

Shorts with Legs 

The Beaning
Cold Fish
Emotion 93
Entropia
Hair: The Story of Grass
Pan
The Passage

Shorts with Kimchi: Korean Short Film Sidebar 

Human Stone
The Lady from 406
Lal La Land
Pepper
Unknown Woman

Paired with Features 

Albatross Soup
Bedridden
The Bloody Ballad of Squirt Reynolds
Catcalls
Caterpillarplasty
CC
End Times
Feast on the Young
Floor 9.5
Goodnight
Gutter
Information Superhighway
Keep Your Mouth Shut
Laura & Vineta
Liquid Soul
The Menu
Monstagram
Monster Challenge
My Name Is Marc, And You Can Count On It
Occupant
Rosalina
Salt
The Slows
Sprites
A Thing of Dreams
Time Enforcer

Award Winners 

"Main Competition" Features
Best Picture: DONNYBROOK directed by Tim Sulton
Best Director: Peter Strickland for IN FABRIC

"Next Wave" Features
Best Picture/Director: HOLIDAY directed by Isabella Eklöf
Special Mention for Sébastien Marnier for SCHOOL'S OUT

"Horror" Features
Best Picture: TERRIFIED directed by Demián Rugna
Best Director: Shinichiro Ueda for ONE CUT OF THE DEAD
Special Mention to LUZ directed by Tilman Singer

"Audience Award" Winner
Audience Award Winner: ONE CUT OF THE DEAD directed by Shinichiro Ueda
1st Runner-Up: THE GUILTY directed by Gustav Möller
2nd Runner-Up: AFTER THE SCREAMING STOPS directed by Joe Pearlman and David Soutar

Short With Legs
Best Picture: THE PASSAGE directed by Kitao Sakurai
Special Mention to EMOTION 93 directed by Oz Davidson

Short Fuse: Horror Shorts
Best Picture: ACID (aka ACIDE) directed by Just Philippot

Fantastic Shorts
Best Picture: SQUIRREL directed by Alex Kavutskiy

Fantastic Bumper Competition
DARK BIDDINGS directed by Jensen Yancey

2019 
The 2019 festival took place at the Alamo Drafthouse South Lamar from Sept. 19–26.

World Premieres 
100 Best Kills - The Sweetest Taboo
Amigo
Bloody Birthday - new restoration
Butt Boy
The Cleansing Hour
Climate of the Hunter
Cosmic Candy
Fractured
Genndy Tartakovsky’s Primal
In the Shadow of the Moon
In the Tall Grass
The McPherson Tape - new preservation
The Mortuary Collection
Nail in the Coffin - The Fall and Rise of Vampiro
Night Drive
Night Has Come
The Peanut Butter Solution - new 2K restoration
Random Acts of Violence
Reflections of Evil - new preservation
She Mob - 2K preservation
Tammy and the T-Rex - fully restoration
VFW
Vhyes
The Wave
We Summon the Darkness
Wrinkles in the Clown
Wyrm

International Premieres
Homewrecker
Phil Tippett - Mad Dreams and Monsters

North American Premieres
4x4
Abou Leila
Adoration
Blood Machines
Deerskin
Die Kinder der Toten
The Golden Glove
Iron Fists and Kung Fu Kicks
Keep Me Company
Patrick
Rock, Paper, and Scissors
The True Adventures of Wolfboy

U.S. Premieres
The Antenna
Color Out of Space
The Deeper You Dig
Dogs Don't Wear Pants
First Love
Guns Akimbo
I Lost My Body
Jallikattu
Jojo Rabbit
The Long Walk
Nobadi
The Other Lamb
Pelican Blood
The Platform
Ride Your Wave
Saint Maud
Scream, Queen! My Nightmare on Elm Street
Son of the White Mare
Synchronic
Vivarium
The Whistlers

Texas Premieres
After Midnight
Bliss in 35mm
Come to Daddy
Dolemite Is My Name
Happy Face
Knives and Skin
Koko-di Koko-da
The Last to See Them
Limbo - new preservation
The Lodge
Memory: The Origins of Alien
Parasite
The Pool
Swallow
Sweetheart
The Vast of Night
Why Don't You Just Die!
You Don't Nomi

Austin Premieres
The Death of Dick Long

Retrospective Screenings 
 The Black Pit of Dr. M
 Lyle
 A Nightmare on Elm Street 2: Freddy's Revenge in 35mm
 Prey
 The Ship of Monsters
 Trampa Infernal

Shorts

Horror Features 

 The Color Out of Space

Celebration of Fantastic Fest (2020) 
2020

In 2020, due to the prevalence of COVID-19, the physical festival was canceled. Instead, they held a completely free, virtual festival with a reduced lineup called Celebration of Fantastic Fest. The virtual event also included two special physical screenings and virtual parties.

World Premieres

 Action U.S.A (world premiere of the 4K restoration)
 Bloodthirsty (dir. Amelia Moses)
 The Boy Behind The Door  (dir. David Charbonier & Justin Powell)
 Daughters of Darkness (world premiere of the 4k restoration)
 The Stylist (dir. Jill Gevargizian)
 How To Deter a Robber (dir. Maria Bissell)

International Premieres

 Laughter (dir. Martin Laroche)
 Teddy (dir. Ludovic Boukherma & Zoran Boukherma)

North American Premieres

 Queen of Black Magic (dir. Kimo Stamboel)

US Premieres

 Girl (dir. Chad Faust)
 The Old Man Movie (Mikk Mägi & Oskar Lehemaa)

Texas Premieres

 Posssesor (dir. Brandon Cronenberg)
 The Wolf of Snow Hollow (dir. Jim Cummings)

Austin Premieres

AGFA presents Triple Fisher: The Lethal Lolitas of Long Island (dir. Dan Kapelovitz)

Festivals by year (2021 — present)

2021 
The 2021 festival took place at the Alamo Drafthouse South Lamar from 23 to 30 September. The festival was held in reformated structure due to restrictions of COVID-19 pandemic aftermath.

Feature films
 A Banquet
 After Blue
 Agnes
 Alone With You
 Benedetta
 The Beta Test
 Belle
 Beyond the Infinite 2 Minutes
 Bingo Hell
 Black Friday
 The Black Phone
 Cannon Arm and the Arcade Quest
 Dead & Beautiful
 The Deer King
 Hellbender
 The Innocents
 Iké Boys
 King Car
 Lamb
 Last Night in Soho
 Let the Wrong One In
 Luzifer
 Masking Threshold
 Once Upon a time in Uganda
 Preman
 The Sadness
 Silent Night
 Slumber Party Massacre
 Sweetie, You Won't Believe It
 There's Someone Inside Your House
 Titane
 The Trip
 V/H/S/94
 Woodlands Dark and Days Bewitched

2022 
The 2022 festival took place at the Alamo Drafthouse in South Lamar, Austin, Texas from September 22 to September 29, with virtual screenings taking place from September 29 to October 4.

World premieres
 Amazing Elisa (Sadrac González-Perellón, Spain, 2022)
 The Antares Paradox (Luis Tinoco Pineda, Spain 2022)
 Birdemic 3: Sea Eagle (James Nguyen, USA, 2022)
 Blood Flower (Dain Said, Malaysia, 2022)
 Blood Relatives (Noah Segan, USA, 2022)
 Disappear Completely (Luis Javier Henaine, Mexico, 2022)
 Flowing (Paolo Strippoli, Italy, Belgium, 2022)
 Garcia! (Eugenio Mira, Spain, 2022; first 2 episodes)
 Kids vs. Aliens (Jason Eisener, USA, 2022)
 King on Screen (Daphné Baiwir, France, USA, 2022)
 Hellraiser (David Bruckner, USA, 2022; surprise screening)
 The Legacy of The Texas Chain Saw Massacre (Phillip Escott, United Kingdom, 2022)
 Mister Organ (David Farrier, New Zealand, 2022)
 NightMare (Kjersti Helen Rasmussen, Norway, 2022)
 Razzennest (Johannes Grenzfurthner, Austria, 2022; Burnt Ends showcase)
 Satanic Hispanics (Mike Mendez, Demian Rugna, Eduardo Sánchez, Gigi Saul Guerrero & Alejandro Brugués, USA, Mexico, Argentina, 2022)
 Smile (Parker Finn, USA, 2022)
 Solomon King (Jack Bomay & Sal Watts, USA, 1974; 4K Restoration)
 Spoonful of Sugar (Mercedes Bryce Morgan, USA, 2022)
 The Stairway to Stardom Mixtape (AFGA, USA, 2022)
 Video Diary of a Lost Girl (Lindsay Denniberg, USA, 2022; new preservation)
 Terminal USA (Jon Moritsugu, USA, 1993; 4K restoration)
 Werewolf by Night (Michael Giacchino, USA, 2022; surprise screening)

US Premieres 
 The Banshees of Inisherin (Martin McDonagh, UK/Ireland, USA, 2022)
 Country Gold (Mickey Reece, USA, 2022)
 Decision to Leave (Park Chan-wook, South Korea, 2022)
 Demigod: The Legend Begins (Chris Huang Wen Chang, Taiwan, 2022)
 The Elderly (Raúl Cerezo & Fernando González Gómez, Spain, 2022)
 Final Cut (Michel Hazanavicius, France, 2022)
 Give Me Pity (Amanda Kramer, USA, 2022)
 Joint Security Area (Park Chan-wook, South Korea, 2000; restoration) 
 La Pietà (Eduardo Casanova, Spain, Argentina, 2022)
 Manticore (Carlos Vermut, Spain, 2022)
 The Menu (Mark Mylod, USA, 2022)
 Missing (Shinzô Katayama, Japan, 2021)
 Nightsiren (Tereza Nvotová, Slovakia, Czech Republic, 2022)
 The Offering (Oliver Park, USA, 2022)
 The People's Joker (Vera Drew, USA, 2022)
 Project Wolf Hunting (Kim Hongsun, South Korea, 2022)
 Sick (John Hyams, USA, 2022)
 Sick of Myself (Kristoffer Borgli, Norway, Sweden, 2022)
 Triangle of Sadness (Ruben Östlund, Sweden, 2022)
 Unicorn Wars (Alberto Vázquez, Spain, France, 2022)
 V/H/S/99 (Johannes Roberts, Maggie Levin, Flying Lotus, Tyler MacIntyre, Vanessa Winter & Joseph Winter, USA, 2022)
 Venus (Jaume Balagueró, Spain, 2022)
 Vesper (Kristina Buožytė & Bruno Samper, Belgium, France, Lithuania, 2022)

International premieres 
 Evil Eye (Isaac Ezban, Mexico, 2022)
 Nothing (Trine Piil & Seamus McNally, Denmark, Germany, 2022)

North-American premieres 
 Aatank (Prem Lalwani & Desh Mukherjee, India, 1996)
 Bad City (Kensuke Sonomura, Japan, 2022)
 Deep Fear (Grégory Beghin, France, 2022)
 Everyone Will Burn (Davier Hebrero, Spain, 2021)
 The Five Devils (Léa Mysius, France, 2022)
 Gamera vs. Zigra (Noriaki Yuasa, Japan, 1971)
 H4Z4RD (Jonas Govaerts, Belgium, 2022)
 Medusa Deluxe (Thomas Hardiman, United Kingdom, 2022)
 The Strange Case of Jacky Caillou (Lucas Delangle, France, 2022)
 Terrifier 2 (Damien Leone, USA, 2022)
 Tropic (Edouard Salier, France, 2022)
 The Visitor From the Future (François Descraques, France, 2022)
 Year of the Shark (Ludovic Boukherma & Zoran Boukherma, France, 2022)

Texas premieres

 A Life on the Farm (Oscar Harding, United Kingdom, 2022)
 All Jacked Up and Full of Worms (Alex Phillips, USA, 2022)
 A Wounded Fawn (Travis Stevens, USA, 2022)
 Attachment (Gabriel Bier Gislason, Denmark, 2022)
 Bones and All (Luca Guadagnino, USA, 2022)
 Family Dinner (Peter Hengl, Austria, 2022)
 Holy Spider (Ali Abassi, Denmark, 2022)
 Huesera: The Bone Woman (Michelle Garza Cervera, Mexico, 2022)
 Hunt (Lee Jung-jae, South Korea, 2022)
 Leonor Will Never Die (Martika Ramirez Escobar, Philippines, 2022)
 Living with Chucky (Kyra Gardner, USA, 2022)
 Lynch/Oz (Alexandre O. Philippe, USA, 2022)
 Mako: The Jaws of Death (William Grefé, USA, 1976)
 Oink (Mascha Halberstad, The Netherlands, 2022)
 One and Four (Jigme Trinley, China, 2022)
 Piggy (Carlota Pereda, Spain, 2022)
 Shin Ultraman (Shinji Higuchi, Japan, 2022)
 Smoking Causes Coughing (Quentin Dupieux, France, 2022)
 Something in the Dirt (Justin Benson & Aaron Moorhead, USA, 2022)
 Swallowed (Carter Smith, USA, 2022)
 Ultraman 4K Edition (Samaji Nonagase, HajimeTsuburaya & Akio Jissoji, Japan, 1966)
 Unidentified Objects (Juan Felipe Zuleta, USA, 2022)
 We Might As Well Be Dead (Natalia Sinelnikova, Germany, Romania, 2022)

Austin premieres

 Chop & Steele (Ben Steinbauer & Berndt Mader, USA, 2022)

Shark Attack Sidebar

 12 Days of Terror (Jack Sholder, USA, 2004)
 Aatank (Prem Lalwani & Desh Mukherjee, India, 1996)
 Gamera vs. Zigra (Noriaki Yuasa, Japan, 1971)
 Mako: The Jaws of Death (William Grefé, USA, 1976)
 Tintorera! (René Cardona Jr., Mexico, United Kingdom, 1977)

Official Competition Selection

 Amazing Elisa (Sadrac González-Perellón, Spain, 2022)
 Holy Spider (Ali Abassi, Denmark, 2022)
 Huesera (Michelle Garza Cervera, Mexico, Peru, 2022)
 La Pietà (Eduardo Casanova, Spain, Argentina, 2022)
 NightMare (Kjersti Helen Rasmussen, Norway, 2022)
 Nightsiren (Tereza Nvotová, Slovakia, Czech Republic, 2022)
 Spoonful of Sugar (Mercedes Bryce Morgan, USA, 2022)
 Year of the Shark (Ludovic Boukherma & Zoran Boukherma, France, 2022)

Horror Competition Selection

 Blood Flower (Dain Said, Malaysia, 2022)
 Deep Fear (Grégory Beghin, France, 2022)
 Piggy (Carlota Pereda, Spain, 2022)
 Project Wolf Hunting (Kim Hongsun, South Korea, 2022)
 Satanic Hispanics (Mike Mendez, Demian Rugna, Eduardo Sánchez, Gigi Saul Guerrero & Alejandro Brugués, USA, Mexico, Argentina, 2022)
 Terrifier 2 (Damien Leone, USA, 2022)
 V/H/S/99 (Johannes Roberts, Maggie Levin, Flying Lotus, Tyler MacIntyre, Vanessa Winter & Joseph Winter, USA, 2022)
 Venus (Jaume Balagueró, Spain, 2022)

Next Wave Competition

 Everyone Will Burn (Davier Hebrero, Spain, 2021)
 Family Dinner (Peter Hengl, Austria, 2022)
 Flowing (Paolo Strippoli, Italy, Belgium, 2022)
 Leonor Will Never Die (Martika Ramirez Escobar, Philippines, 2022)
 Medusa Deluxe (Thomas Hardiman, United Kingdom, 2022)
 The Five Devils (Léa Mysius, France, 2022)
 Tropic (Edouard Salier, France, 2022)
 We Might As Well Be Dead (Natalia Sinelnikova, Germany, Romania, 2022)

Jurors

Official Competition 

 Liane Cunje (Canada)
 Jongsuk Thomas Nam (South Korea)
 Lars Nilsen (USA)

Horror Competition

 Johannes Grenzfurthner (Austria)
 Adam Koehler (USA)
 Caryn Coleman (USA)

Next Wave Competition

 Liz Purchell (USA)
 Kerry Deignan Roy (USA)
 Drew Taylore (USA)

Short Films Competition

 Brad Abrahams (USA)
 Michelle Garza (Mexico)
 Addison Heiman (USA)

See also
 European Fantastic Film Festivals Federation

Other genre film festivals
 Sitges Film Festival
 Fantasia International Film Festival
 Screamfest Horror Film Festival
 Brussels International Fantastic Film Festival
 Bucheon International Fantastic Film Festival
 Dead by Dawn
 London FrightFest Film Festival
 Fantafestival
 International Horror and Sci-Fi Film Festival
 New York City Horror Film Festival
 Toronto After Dark Film Festival
 TromaDance
 Night Visions
 South African Horrorfest
 Nightmares Film Festival
 BizarroLand Film Festival

References

External links
 

Fantasy and horror film festivals in the United States
Film festivals in Austin, Texas
Multigenre conventions
Film festivals established in 2005
2005 establishments in Texas
Science fiction film festivals